Norse Energy was a petroleum and natural gas (tight gas) exploration and production as well as pipeline operator. Though based in Lysaker outside Oslo, Norway the company operated in the United States and Brazil. It went bankrupt in 2014.

References

External links

Oil companies of Norway
Natural gas companies of Norway
Companies based in Oslo
Energy companies established in 2005
Non-renewable resource companies established in 2005
Multinational companies headquartered in Norway